Shi Jinglin (born 3 January 1993) is a Chinese competitive swimmer who specializes in the breaststroke events. She has produced a tally of five medals, two golds and three bronze, in major international competition, spanning the Olympic Games, Asian Games, and World Championships. At the 2014 Asian Games, Shi broke a meet record to claim the gold medal in the 100 m breaststroke.

Career
Shi made her first Chinese team at the 2014 Asian Games in Incheon, South Korea, where she achieved two medals, a gold and a bronze, in swimming. She started off the meet by surpassing Japan's Kanako Watanabe in the first half of the race to smash the Asian Games record for a gold medal victory in the 100 m breaststroke with a time of 1:06.67, vaulting her up to eighth in the world rankings. The following day, in the 200 m breaststroke, Shi fell behind the Japanese duo Watanabe and Rie Kaneto in a sprint finish to claim the bronze at 2:23.58.

At the 2015 FINA World Championships in Kazan, Russia, Shi added two more medals, a gold and a bronze, to her career tally. In her first event, 100 m breaststroke, Shi lowered her personal best to 1:06.55 for a fifth-place finish in the final, missing out the podium by 0.13 seconds. Three days later, Shi swam a matching time of 2:22.76 in a three-way tie with Spain's Jessica Vall Montero and Denmark's world-record holder Rikke Møller Pedersen for a bronze in the 200 m breaststroke final. On the final night of the meet, Shi and her teammates Fu Yuanhui, Lu Ying, and Shen Duo put up a fast finish in 3:54.41 to claim the gold in the 4 × 100 m medley relay, just over two seconds away of the current meet record set by her team in 2009.

References

External links
2014 Asian Games Profile

1993 births
Living people
Chinese female breaststroke swimmers
Swimmers at the 2016 Summer Olympics
Olympic swimmers of China
Swimmers at the 2014 Asian Games
Swimmers at the 2018 Asian Games
Asian Games medalists in swimming
Sportspeople from Nanjing
World Aquatics Championships medalists in swimming
Asian Games gold medalists for China
Asian Games bronze medalists for China
Medalists at the 2016 Summer Olympics
Olympic bronze medalists for China
Olympic bronze medalists in swimming
Medalists at the 2014 Asian Games
Medalists at the 2018 Asian Games
Nanjing Sport Institute alumni
20th-century Chinese women
21st-century Chinese women